Stewart Shining is a New York City-based photographer of contemporary actors, musicians, and models.  Shining, born in Burlington, Vermont, and who grew up in Rapid City, South Dakota, studied at the Parsons School of Design in the early 1980s and has been commissioned by both Vanity Fair and Vogue.  He has worked on ad campaigns for Abercrombie & Fitch, Victoria's Secret, J. Crew, Ralph Lauren and Express.  In 2001, he photographed Elsa Benítez, Luján Fernández, Daniela Peštová, and Shakara Ledard for the Sports Illustrateds Swimsuit Issue, and one of his photos of Benítez (pictured right) was selected for the cover.  He has continued to participate as a regular photographer for the annual Swimsuit Issue and recently shot for the upcoming "body painting" feature for 2011.

One of Shining's favorite photos occurred on assignment in Phuket, Thailand when a model jumped in the rain-pelted ocean.   He has shot a pre-teen Natalie Portman,  and more recently, when Drew Barrymore was named People Magazine's 2007 "World's Most Beautiful Person" Shining was chosen as the photographer.  He has produced numerous covers for Rolling Stone magazine including covers in back to back months in 2002.  He has also had numerous cover shots for Lucky, Self and Glamour.  Among his recent photo shoot subjects are Evangeline Lilly, Pink, Keira Knightley, and Alessandra Ambrosio. In 2008, Shining took Alicia Keys' publicity shots for As I Am.  Also, in 2008 his photos of Rachel Bilson appeared in Lucky.

Shining serves on the Robert Mapplethorpe Foundation, and is the president of ACRIA.  He has volunteered to take photographs on behalf of the Heart Gallery of New Jersey to help children find adoptive parents.

Notes

External links
Personal website

Fashion photographers
Living people
Photographers from New York City
People from Rapid City, South Dakota
American portrait photographers
Year of birth missing (living people)